The 2006 FIBA Europe Under-16 Championship Division B was an international basketball competition held in Estonia in 2006.

Medalists
1.   Czech Republic

2.   Georgia

3.   Bulgaria

Final ranking (comparative)
1.  Czech Republic

2.  Bulgaria

3.  Austria

4.  Belgium

5.  Georgia

6.  Bosnia and Herzegovina

7.  Sweden

8.  England

9.  Finland

10.  Poland

11.  Norway

12.  Estonia

13.  Hungary

14.  Netherlands

15.  Slovakia

16.  Ireland

17.  Luxembourg

18.  Romania

External links
FIBA Archive

FIBA U16 European Championship Division B
2006–07 in European basketball
2006–07 in Estonian basketball
International youth basketball competitions hosted by Estonia